Grand Prix Eddy Merckx was a cycle race around Brussels, where Eddy Merckx was born. It was held between 1980 and 2004, disappearing after the creation of the UCI ProTour in 2005. The race was initially an individual time trial, becoming a Team time trial of two riders in 1998. It usually had a duration of 60-70 km, with the 2003 being the shortest at 26 km because of a nearby fire.

Winners

References

Cycle races in Belgium
Recurring sporting events established in 1981
1981 establishments in Belgium
Defunct cycling races in Belgium
Recurring sporting events disestablished in 2004
Sports competitions in Brussels
2004 disestablishments in Belgium
Eddy Merckx
Men's road bicycle races